The Cassadines are a fictional aristocratic family from the American soap opera General Hospital. Created by executive producer Gloria Monty, the family was first introduced in February 1981, with the arrival of Tony Cassadine. Brothers Victor and Mikkos were introduced months later. The Cassadines are descendants of Russian royalty and own their own private island in Greece. Various family members have been sometime residents of Port Charles, living in Wyndemere Castle on Spoon Island. The family is known for their longtime feud with the Spencer family. After the family's initial appearance in 1981, they were absent from the series until the arrival of Stavros Cassadine in 1983. The Cassadine family owns and operates the international conglomerate Cassadine Industries. The family is currently represented on canvas by Valentin, Victor, Alexis, Sam, Kristina, Molly, Danny, Spencer, and Scout.

Background
The Cassadine's are descendants of the Russian aristocracy, with connections to the royal Romanov family. They existed for hundreds of years in Russia until the Bolshevik Revolution forced them to flee to Greece. After that period, they built a large economic empire of power and wealth. The Cassadine's  make their first appearance in the 1980s, when Mikkos Cassadine, the patriarch of the family, along with his brothers Victor and Tony, are involved in various nefarious plans, including the Ice Princess storyline, a plot to freeze the world using a weather machine. When Luke Spencer foils their plan, the great feud between the Spencers and Cassadines begins. Elizabeth Taylor originated the role of villain Helena Cassadine, Mikkos' wife, in this era. Her curse on Luke and Laura's wedding was watched by over 30 million viewers.

Traditions
Cassadine line of succession  The Cassadine title of "Prince" passes from eldest son to eldest son, and the authority that goes with it both symbolic and real. If a Cassadine Prince were to die without a male heir the title would die with him and the fortune he controlled would be scattered amongst the surviving family members.
Cassadine Bacchanalia  A traditional masquerade ball thrown in honor of a Cassadine engagement.

Family members
Characters currently on the show are noted in bold; family members through marriage are in italics. Only current spouses or those married at the time of their death appear here.

Distant ancestors
Vladimir Cassadine - The First Cassadine said by Nikolas to be a warrior who founded the Cassadine Empire of Imperial Russia.
Anya Cassadine
Prince Nikolai Cassadine
Nikolas Cassadine (I)

Ancestors
Prince Stanislaus Cassadine
Katya Cassadine
 Ivan Cassadine - Based on Mikkos's middle name, which is "Ivanovich"—all of the children in the Cassadine family follow the Russian tradition of a patronymic.
Irina Cassadine - According to Stefan, his grand aunt, making her Mikkos's aunt.
Eugenia Cassadine

First generation
Prince Mikkos Ivanovich Cassadine, Oldest of the Cassadine siblings.
Helena Romanov
Victor Cassadine - Middle brother of the trio.
Anthony "Tony" Cassadine - Youngest of the brothers.
Sophia Cassadine-Davidovitch - Sister of Mikkos, Victor and Tony.
Alexei Davidovitch
Petros Cassadine - Cousin of Mikkos, Tony, Sophia, and Victor.
Dimitri Cassadine - 10th cousin, several times removed of Mikkos.

Second generation
Prince Stavros Nikolai Mikkossovich Cassadine - Son of Mikkos and Helena.
Stefan Darius Mikkossovich Cassadine - Son of Mikkos and Helena.
Alexis Davis (born Princess Natasha Alexandra Mikkosovna Cassadine) - Daughter of Mikkos and Kristin Bergman.
Kristina Cassadine - Daughter of Mikkos and Kristin Bergman.
Valentin Victorovich Cassadine - Son of Helena and Victor
Irina Cassadine - Daughter of Helena.

Third generation
Prince Nikolas Mikail Stavrossovich Cassadine - Son of Stavros and Laura Spencer.
Samantha "Sam" McCall - Daughter of Alexis and Julian Jerome.
Kristina Adela Corinthos-Davis - Daughter of Alexis and Sonny Corinthos.
Molly Lansing-Davis - Daughter of Alexis and Ric Lansing.
Charlotte Cassadine - Daughter of Valentin and Lulu Spencer.

Fourth generation
Spencer Stefan Nikolasovich Cassadine - Son of Nikolas and Courtney Matthews.
Lila McCall - Daughter of Sam and Sonny Corinthos.
Daniel Edward "Danny" Morgan - Son of Sam and Jason Morgan.
Emily Scout Cain - Daughter of Sam and Drew Cain.

Other relations
In 1998 Nikolas was led to believe that he was not the Cassadine Prince. During this time Stefan attempted to convince him to try and hold on to control of the Cassadine Estate. Nikolas refused, stating that the Estate didn't belong to him if he was not the Prince, it belonged to "the Belgian Cassadines, and the Baron's children in Macao, and to Helena, Alexis and Cousin Mikhail who took Holy orders -- "

Cassadine Industries
Owned by The Cassadines. Cassadine Industries is a large international conglomerate, which was founded by the Cassadine family in the late 1970s as a front to cover for their dirty dealings. But the business took off, being controlled by Mikkos Cassadine, Stavros Cassadine, Helena Cassadine, Stefan Cassadine and Nikolas Cassadine amongst others. In December 2005, a single Cassandine Industries account was estimated to be worth $15 million at the time. As of May 2009, Cassadine Industries was estimated to be worth over 20 billion dollars. Reportedly in 2015, Helena Cassadine and Victor Cassadine had liquidated most of Cassadine Industries in order to finance their personal "projects". In 2015, Nikolas Cassadine obtained control of ELQ in order to save his family empire. In 2016, following Nikolas Cassadine's death, it was revealed that Valentin Cassadine is the sole heir to the Cassadine empire. In 2020, this was reversed through a secret codicil to Mikkos' will that revealed Valentin is Helena's son and not a Cassadine at all. Thus, Nikolas was reinstated as sole heir.

Subsidiaries
Cassadine Drilling Company
Cassadine Construction
General Hospital
Emily Bowen Quartermaine Clinic
Equinox Corporation

Employees
CEO and Sole Shareholder Money is Frozen

Residence

Wyndemere Castle (Spoon Island)

Family tree
Legend

Descendants

 Stanislaus Cassadine (deceased); married Katya Cassadine (deceased)
 Irina Cassadine (deceased); Daughter of Stanislaus and Katya
 Unknown first name Cassadine (deceased); son of Stanislaus and Katya; married Unnamed woman (deceased)
Petros Cassadine (deceased); Identical cousin of Mikkos
 Unknown first name Cassadine (deceased); Son of Stanislaus and Katya; married Unnamed woman (deceased)
 Dimitri Cassadine; Cousin to Mikkos
Ivan Cassadine (deceased); son of Stanislaus and Katya; married Unnamed woman (deceased)
 Mikkos Cassadine (died 1981); son of Ivan; married Helena Cassadine
 Stavros Cassadine (died 2014); Mikkos and Helena's son; married Laura Spencer (1982–83), Lulu Spencer (2013)
 Nikolas Cassadine (1982–); Stavros and Laura's son; married Lydia Karenin (2003), Mary Bishop (2004), Emily Quartermaine (2004–05), Hayden Barnes (2016–20), Ava Jerome (2020–)
 Spencer Cassadine (2006–); Nikolas' son with Courtney Matthews
 Stefan Cassadine (died 2003); Mikkos and Helena's son; married Bobbie Spencer (1996–97)
 Alexis Davis (1966–); Mikkos' daughter with Kristin Bergman, born Natasha Cassadine; married Jasper Jacks (1999–2000), Ric Lansing (2004–06), Julian Jerome (2016)
 Sam McCall (1980–); Alexis and Julian's daughter; married Jason Morgan (2011–18), Drew Cain (2018)
 Lila McCall (2004); Sam's daughter with Sonny Corinthos
 Danny Morgan (2011–); Sam and Jason's son
 Scout Cain (2017–); Sam and Drew's daughter
 Kristina Davis (2002–); Alexis' daughter with Sonny Corinthos; married Trey Mitchell (2012)
 Molly Lansing (2005–); Alexis and Ric's daughter
 Kristina Cassadine (died 2002); Mikkos' daughter with Kristin Bergman
 Anthony "Tony" Cassadine (died 1981); son of Ivan
 Victor Cassadine; son of Ivan
 Valentin Cassadine; Victor's son with Helena; married Nina Reeves (2016–2018)
 Charlotte Cassadine; Valentin's daughter with Lulu Spencer
 Sophia Cassadine (deceased); daughter of Ivan; married Alexei Davidovitch (deceased)

References

General Hospital characters
General Hospital families
Fictional royalty